Fernanda Abreu (born September 8, 1961) is a Brazilian singer.

Biography
Fernanda was born and raised in a middle-class family of the South Zone of Rio de Janeiro. Her first notable public appearance was the backing vocal of the band Blitz until 1986. After that, in 1990, she started a solo career, achieving great success in her native country.

In 1989, she met Herbert Vianna, and with his help and encouragement formed a funk band. Her first solo album, SLA Radical Dance Disco Club (1990), was produced by Herbert Vianna and Fábio Fonseca and had a hit with A Noite, composed with Luiz Stein and Laufer. Her second album, SLA2/Be Sample (1992), was one of the earliest Brazilian pop records to extensively employ the sampler, and had success with Rio 40 Graus, composed with Fausto Fawcett and Laufer, portraying Rio de Janeiro climate, people and lifestyle. Since then, Abreu has been considered the first lady of Brazilian funk.

In 2006, she released Ao Vivo MTV, the first DVD of her career, which includes many of her hit songs.

Abreu is married to the musician and designer Luiz Stein and has 2 daughters, Alice and Sofia.

Discography

Live albums

Collected

References

1961 births
Living people
20th-century Brazilian women singers
20th-century Brazilian singers
Brazilian people of Portuguese descent
Musicians from Rio de Janeiro (city)
Funk carioca musicians
Pontifical Catholic University of Rio de Janeiro alumni
21st-century Brazilian women singers
21st-century Brazilian singers